Fire and Blood for solo violin and orchestra by composer Michael Daugherty is a 25-minute concerto inspired by Diego Rivera's  Detroit Industry Murals and Frida Kahlo's paintings done in Detroit. It was commissioned by the Detroit Symphony Orchestra during Michael Daugherty's time as composer in residence (1999-2003).

Instrumentation
Solo violin; 2 flutes, 2 oboes, 2 clarinets in Bb, 2 bassoons; 2 or 4 horns, 2 trumpets in C; 5 timpani, 2 percussion (I=marimba/glockenspiel/suspended cymbal/piccolo triangle/medium maracas/guiro/small brake drum/large whip; II=marimba/2 crotales/small tam-tam/triangle/large maracas/medium and large brake drums/ratchet); harp; strings

Movements
I.  Volcano
II.  River Rouge
III.  Assembly Line

Premiere
The world premiere performance took place May 3, 2003, at Symphony Hall, Detroit, Michigan; with Ida Kavafian on violin, accompanied by Detroit Symphony Orchestra, under the baton of Neeme Järvi.

Discography
Naxos: Fire and Blood / MotorCity Triptych / Raise the Roof (Kavafian, B. Jones, Detroit Symphony, N. Jarvi)

References

External links
Program Notes
Composer's Official Website
Detroit Free Press Album Review

Concertos by Michael Daugherty
2003 compositions
Daugherty
21st-century classical music
Music commissioned by the Detroit Symphony Orchestra